Lepyoshkin or Lepeshkin is a male Slavic surname, its feminine counterpart is Lepyoshkina or Lepeshkina. Notable people with the surname include:

Anatoly Lepyoshkin (born 1938), Russian speedskater
 Mikhail Lepeshkin, Kazakhstan biathlete